Darlow may refer to:

Darlow (surname)
Darlow, Kansas